Gerald Stuart O'Loughlin Jr. (December 23, 1921 – July 31, 2015) was an American television, stage, and film actor and director who was primarily known for playing tough-talking and rough-looking characters. He is best known for Ed Ryker on The Rookies (1972-1976).

Overview
After a stint with the United States Marine Corps, O'Loughlin used his GI Bill of Rights benefits to train at the Neighborhood Playhouse in New York City. Continuing to hone his skills at the Actors Studio, he would land a handful of TV and/or film roles throughout the 1950s.

Early years
O'Loughlin was a native of New York City. Before becoming an actor, he earned a college degree in mechanical engineering.

Military service
O'Loughlin served two tours of duty in the Marines, enlisting during World War II and being recalled to active duty for the Korean War.

Television
It was during the 1960s and 1970s, however, that O'Loughlin would become virtually ubiquitous on TV, his workload decreasing only slightly during the century's final two decades. One of his early guest-starring roles was on "A Man for Mary" episode of ABC's 1962 comedy-drama Going My Way.

He appeared in the 1965 Gunsmoke episode "Twenty Miles from Dodge".  O'Loughlin played a tough but not insensitive gang leader of stagecoach robbers holding the passengers as hostages for ransom.  Among them was Kitty (Amanda Blake) who plays her usual tough-as-nails saloon-keeper, who comforts the freezing and hungry, while battling the desperadoes and a feisty, crafty fellow passenger played by Darren McGavin.  O'Loughlin manages to get his hands on the loot, $62,000 & change, but is thwarted by the ingenious explosion of bullets collected round-about by McGavin.  This is one of the more grueling and compelling episodes of this western, featuring a strong ensemble cast alongside James Arness, displaying the relentless Marshal Matt Dillon, and aided by the ever-jawin' Festus, Ken Curtis. Sixteen years later, O'Loughlin reunited with Arness in the made-for-TV film McClain's Law, structured as the pilot for Arness' 1981–82 police detective series.

O'Loughlin appeared in an episode of the 1961 television series The Asphalt Jungle. In 1966 he portrayed truck driver Carl Munger (S2:Ep7) and in 1972 he portrayed a robber named Kulhane (S7:Ep21) in the TV series, The F.B.I. He appeared in three episodes of Hawaii Five-O. The first was aired January 29, 1969 in the episode "The Box". O'Loughlin played the tough but sympathetic central figure of a group of prison inmates who take Hawaii Five-O chief Steve McGarrett (Jack Lord) hostage. The second was called "Six Kilos" on March 12, 1969 (playing the same character as in "The Box"), and the third was called "A Time to Die" on September 16, 1970.  He also appeared on Cannon on February 22, 1972, in the episode "Flight of the Hawks". He also appeared on episode 16 of the TV show  The Green Hornet.  In Season 2 Episode 22 of Mission: Impossible, he played a killer for hire.

In 1970–1971, O'Loughlin portrayed Devin McNeil in the CBS crime drama Storefront Lawyers (which was later revised and retitled and became Men at Law).

From 1972 to 1976 O'Loughlin appeared as Lt. Ed Ryker on The Rookies. In 1978, he appeared in the pilot episode of The Eddie Capra Mysteries, and had roles in TV miniseries such as Wheels (1978), Women in White (1979), Roots: The Next Generations (1979) and Blind Ambition (1979). He also appeared as Sgt. O'Toole in the 1983 made-for-TV miniseries The Blue and the Gray. Also in 1983, he appeared as Gen. Schwerin, hoping to meet Marilyn Monroe, in the M*A*S*H Episode "Bombshells."  He was also a regular the series Automan (1983) and Our House (1986). Also in 1986, O'Loughlin played the part of Mr. Parks in a first season episode of Highway to Heaven entitled "The Brightest Star". 

In 1988, he played Tom Callahan in Dirty Dancing. In 1992 he appeared as Ben Oliver in Murder She Wrote in the episode "Badge of Honor".

Stage
O'Loughlin's professional acting career began in repertory work at Crystal Lake Theatre in upstate New York. The highlight of O'Loughlin's stage career was a national tour of A Streetcar Named Desire as Stanley Kowalski, opposite Tallulah Bankhead as Blanche DuBois.

Film
O'Loughlin's movie credits include Ensign Pulver, In Cold Blood, Ice Station Zebra, The Valachi Papers and Twilight's Last Gleaming.

Personal life and death
O'Loughlin and his wife Meryl Abeles O'Loughlin (1933–2007), had two children: Chris O'Loughlin (born 1967), a member of the 1992 United States Olympic épée fencing team, and Laura O'Loughlin. O'Loughlin died of natural causes in Los Angeles on July 31, 2015.

Filmography

References

External links

Gerald O'Loughlin at the University of Wisconsin's Actors Studio audio collection

1921 births
American male film actors
American male stage actors
American male television actors
2015 deaths
Male actors from New York City
United States Marines
Male actors from Los Angeles
United States Marine Corps personnel of World War II
United States Marine Corps personnel of the Korean War